William Court Gully, 1st Viscount Selby PC, KC (29 August 18356 November 1909) was a British lawyer and Liberal politician. He served as Speaker of the House of Commons between 1895 and 1905.

Background and education
Gully was the son of James Manby Gully of Malvern, a successful physician who became involved in the mysterious death of Charles Bravo in April 1876. His grandfather was Daniel Gully, a Jamaican coffee planter. He was educated at University College School, London and then Trinity College, Cambridge, where he was president of the Union. He was called to the bar by the Inner Temple in 1860, went the northern circuit, and took silk in 1877.

Political career

In 1880 and 1883 Gully unsuccessfully contested Whitehaven as a Liberal, but was elected for Carlisle in 1886, and continued to represent that constituency until his elevation to the peerage. In April 1895 he was elected Speaker by a majority of eleven votes over Sir Matthew White Ridley, the Unionist nominee. The choice of Gully was a surprise to Lord Rosebery's cabinet.  Rosebery did not want a Unionist as the new Speaker of the House of Commons, but rejected the two alternatives of Richard Haldane and Sir Frank Lockwood. Rosebery faced hostility in his cabinet from Sir William Vernon Harcourt and from the opposition, and Harcourt wanted the Liberal Unionist Leonard Courtney as Speaker. Harcourt viewed this as purely a matter for the House of Commons (Rosebery being in the House of Lords). To Rosebery it became a minor cabinet crisis. Finally in disgust Harcourt placed the onus of the decision on Rosebery. Eventually the backbenchers of the Commons who knew Gully propelled him - most likely because he was close to Sir William Herschell. Harcourt was forced to produce the name to the House of Commons. The Conservatives were not happy about his selection, and (recalling the scandal that engulfed his father) would greet his appearance in the House with cries of "Bravo, Gully!". In 1905 he resigned and was raised to the peerage with the title of Viscount Selby, of the City of Carlisle, the name being that of his wife (see below).

He died in November 1909, aged 74, and was succeeded by his son, James.

Family
Lord Selby married, in 1865, Elizabeth Selby (died 1906), daughter of Thomas Selby. They had six children:
James William Herschell Gully, 2nd Viscount Selby (1867–1923)
Hon. Edward Walford Karslake Gully, CB (1870–1931), who married 1901 Ada Symon
Hon. Gertrude Anne Gully (died 1949), who married 1888 His Honour James Aloysius Scully, Judge of Brighton District Court.
Hon. Florence Julia Gully (died 1949), who married 1892 Sir William Guy Granet.
Hon. Mary Honorah Rhoda Gully (died 1961), who married 1894 Sir Adrian Donald Wilde Pollock (1867–1943).
Hon. Elizabeth Kate Shelley Gully (died 1908), who married first 1902 Captain Carleton Salkeld, and secondly Hon. Edward Brabazon Meade.

Arms

Notes

References

 James, Robert Rhodes. Rosebery: A Biography of Archibald Primrose, Fifth Earl of Rosebery. New York: The Macmillan Company, 1963, 1964, p. 371-373.

 Ruddick, James. Death at the Priory: Sex, Love, and Murder in Victorian England. New York: Atlantic Monthly Press, 2001. . (P. 185).

External links 
 

1835 births
1909 deaths
Alumni of Trinity College, Cambridge
Presidents of the Cambridge Union
Speakers of the House of Commons of the United Kingdom
Selby, William Gully, 1st Viscount
Members of the Privy Council of the United Kingdom
Liberal Party (UK) MPs for English constituencies
UK MPs 1886–1892
UK MPs 1892–1895
UK MPs 1895–1900
UK MPs 1900–1906
UK MPs who were granted peerages
People educated at University College School
Peers created by Edward VII
William